San Giovanni Battista is the Italian translation of Saint John the Baptist. 

It may also refer to:

Italian churches
 San Giovanni Battista, Highway A11, a church in Florence, Italy
 San Giovanni Battista, Praiano, a church in Praiano, Italy
 , a church in Vittorio Veneto, Italy
 Turin Cathedral, dedicated to San Giovanni Battista
 San Giovanni Battista in Brovinje

Other uses
San Giovanni Battista, An Oratorio by the composer Alessandro Stradella

See also

 Battista
 Giovanni Battista
 San Giovanni (disambiguation)
 Giovanni (disambiguation)
 San (disambiguation)